Turritella annulata is a species of sea snail, a marine gastropod mollusk in the family Turritellidae.

Description

Distribution

References

External links
 Kiener, L.C. (1838). Spécies général et iconographie des coquilles vivantes. Vol. 10. Famille des Turbinacées. Genre Turritelle (Turritella, Lam.), pp. 1–46, pl. 1–14 [pp. 1–46 (1844), pl. 1–3, 5, 7–14 (1843), 4, 6 (1844)]; Scalaire (Scalaria, Lam.), pp. 1–22, pl. 1–7 [all (1838)]; Cadran (Solarium,Lam.), pp. 1–12, pl. 1–4 [all (1838)]; Roulette (Rotella, Lam.), pp. 1–10, pl. 1–3 [all (1838)]; Dauphinule (Dephinula, Lam.), pp. 1–12, pl. 1–4 [pp. 1–10 (1838), 11–12 (1842); pl. 1 (1837), 2–4 (1838]; Phasianelle (Phasianella, Lam.), pp. 1–11, pl. 1–5 [pp. 1–11 (1850); pl. 1–3, 5 (1847), 4 (1848)]; Famille des Plicacées de Lamarck, et des Trochoides de Cuvier. Genre Tornatelle (Tornatella, Lamarck), pp. 3–6, pl. 1 [all (1834)]; Genre Pyramidelle (Pyramidella), Lamarck, pp. 1–8, pl. 1–2 [all (1835)]; [Famille des Myacées.] Genre Thracie (Thracia, Leach), pp. 1–7, pl. 1–2 [all (1834)].
 Reeve, L.A. (1849). Monograph of the genus Turritella. In: Conchologia Iconica. vol. 5, pl. 1–11 and unpaginated text. L. Reeve & Co., London.
 mith, E.A. (1872) A list of species of shells from West Africa, with descriptions of those hitherto undescribed. Proceedings of the Zoological Society of London, 1871, 727–739, pl. 75

Turritellidae
Gastropods described in 1843